Fado em Mim is the debut studio album of Portuguese fado singer Mariza, released in April 2002 by Dutch label World Connection.   Later on a special collectors edition was released containing an additional CD with 8 live tracks recorded at the WOMAD 2002.

Release
Released in 2002, Fado em Mim is Mariza's debut studio album. Initially rejected by Portuguese labels, who were uneasy to work with an unproven artist, the album was picked up by Dutch label World Connection. The album was later released in 32 countries.

Reception
In January 2004, Mariza was awarded the European Border Breakers Award, for the international sales of Fado em Mim.

Track listing

Personnel
Mariza – Vocals
Custódio Castelo – Portuguese Guitar
Jorge Fernando – Classic Guitar/Viola
António Neto – Classic Guitar/Viola ("Poetas" & "Ó Gente da Minha Terra")
Marino Freitas – Acoustic Bass
Ricardo Cruz – Acoustic Bass ("Ó Gente da Minha Terra" & "Oiça Lá Ó Senhor Vinho), Double Bass ("Poetas" & "Por Ti")
Tiago Machado – Piano ("Poetas" & "Ó Gente da Minha Terra"[hidden track])
Dalú – Percussion ("Barco Negro")
Davide Zaccaria – Cello ("Há Festa Na Mouraria")
Fernando Nunes – Engineering
Jorge Fernando, Tiago Machado – Production and Arrangement
João Pedro Ruela, Albert Nijimolen – Executive Production

References 

2002 debut albums
Mariza albums
European Border Breakers Award-winning albums